Tian Dawei (August 1931 – 12 June 2013) was a Chinese translator and official. He served as vice president of the National Library of China, and was an official in the Ministry of Culture of the People's Republic of China.

Tian was among the first in China who translated some works of Aleksandr Solzhenitsyn into Chinese.

Biography
Tian was born in a highly educated family, in 1931, in Beijing, the son of An E, a poet and translator, and Tian Han, a playwright who wrote the lyrics for March of the Volunteers in 1934.

In 1936, Tian studied at a primary school in Baoding, Hebei. In 1937, during the Second Sino-Japanese War, Tian fled to Shaanxi.

From 1940 to 1946, Tian studied at Yucai School in Hechuan County, Chongqing.

In June 1946, Tian returned to Beijing and studied at Beijing No. 4 High School.

Tian attended Beifang University from December 1946 to August 1948. Tian entered the North China University of Technology in August 1948, majoring in the Russian language.

After graduating in January 1949 he was appointed an officer to the Ministry of Culture of the People's Republic of China, he retired in February 1994.

Tian joined the Chinese Communist Party in 1953.

Tian died at Beijing Friendship Hospital, in Beijing, on June 12, 2013.

Works
 The Gulag Archipelago (Aleksandr Solzhenitsyn)
 In the First Circle (Aleksandr Solzhenitsyn)
 Dead Souls (Nikolai Gogol)
 Collected Plays of Turgenev (Ivan Turgenev)
 (Ivan Turgenev)

Awards
 Chinese Translation Association - Competent Translator (2004)
 Russian Writers Association - Gorky Literature Prize (2006)

References

1931 births
2013 deaths
Writers from Beijing
North China University of Technology alumni
People's Republic of China translators
Russian–Chinese translators
20th-century Chinese translators
21st-century Chinese translators